Jim Henry (born 8 April 1947) is a Canadian equestrian. He competed in two events at the 1972 Summer Olympics.

References

1947 births
Living people
Canadian male equestrians
Olympic equestrians of Canada
Equestrians at the 1972 Summer Olympics
Pan American Games medalists in equestrian
Pan American Games silver medalists for Canada
Equestrians at the 1975 Pan American Games
Sportspeople from Toronto
Medalists at the 1975 Pan American Games
20th-century Canadian people
21st-century Canadian people